The Cowee–West's Mill Historic District encompasses an area of Macon County, North Carolina, which has historic significance predating the arrival of European settlers, and extending into the 20th century. The district includes the archaeological site and platform mound of the Cherokee town of Cowee, a major settlement until the time of the American Revolutionary War. In the first half of the 19th century the area was developed as a mining community centered on a mill operated by the West family, and after the American Civil War it became one of a small number of rural African-American communities in western North Carolina. The core of the West's Mill area is centered on the junctions of SR 1350, SR 1341, SR 1340, and West's Mill Road, and North Carolina Route 28 is the major road passing through the district. Its northern and southern bounds are roughly where the valley floor gives way to hills on either side of Cowee Creek, ending in the west at Hall Mountain and in the east at the mouth of Caler Creek.

See also
National Register of Historic Places listings in Macon County, North Carolina

References

Art Deco architecture in North Carolina
Historic districts in Macon County, North Carolina
Buildings and structures in Macon County, North Carolina
National Register of Historic Places in Macon County, North Carolina
Historic districts on the National Register of Historic Places in North Carolina